Löfbergs Arena is an arena located in Karlstad, Sweden, situated just above the river delta of Klarälven.  It is primarily used for ice hockey, and is the home arena of Färjestad BK.

It opened in 2001 following a complete overhaul and major expansion of the previously existing arena Färjestads Ishall. It replaced Färjestads Ishall as the home of Färjestad and has a capacity of 8,647 people. The name of the arena comes from the coffee roastery Löfbergs.

Events

In 2004, 2006 and 2018, the arena hosted a semi-final of Melodifestivalen. Other notable music artists and groups who have performed at the arena include Elton John, Bob Dylan, John Fogerty, Bryan Adams, Dolly Parton, Rod Stewart, Motörhead and Judas Priest.

On 30 September 2009 Färjestad BK faced off against the NHL's Detroit Red Wings in an exhibition match from the arena, losing 6–2.

The arena was named the host of the 2010 Men's World Inline Hockey Championships, as well as the 2012 European Curling Championships.

See also
List of indoor arenas in Sweden
List of indoor arenas in Nordic countries

External links 

  
 Hockeyarenas.net entry

Sport in Karlstad
Indoor arenas in Sweden
Indoor ice hockey venues in Sweden
Ice hockey venues in Sweden
Buildings and structures in Värmland County
Curling venues in Sweden
Sports venues completed in 2001
2001 establishments in Sweden